Nada Zeidan (born October 11, 1976) is a Palestinian spokesmodel who happens to be a road racer.

Personal life 
Zeidan was born in Beirut, Lebanon to Palestinian father and Turkish mother. She is the eldest of seven children. She moved to Qatar when she was four, because of the Lebanese Civil War. She has a bachelor's degree in nursing.

Zeidan began practicing archery in 2001. She started rallying in 2004. Zeidan has cited the previous First Lady of Qatar, Mozah bint Nasser Al Missned, as inspirational to her career.

In September 2014, she married George Wassouf, a Syrian singer.

In October 2015, a photo was posted on one of the Lebanese-born Zeidan's social media accounts, along with the caption, "God has given us a babygirl and we've named her Oyoon George Wassouf. Thank you to everyone who congratulated us on the birth," reported Sada El Balad.

Career

Archery 
Zeidan participated in the 2002 Busan and 2006 Doha Asian Games in archery. 2006 was the last time she competed in archery.

"She was the first Qatari, and the first Arab female to compete at the archery competition the 14th Asian Games."

Rallying 
Zeidan is the "first female Arab rally driver".

In 2004, Zeidan won the Middle-East Rally Championship in Dubai.
She also won Ladies Cups in the Middle East Rally Championships in Lebanon and Syria.
In 2010 was the last time Zeidan has raced, she says now she is semi-retired.

Medicine 
Zeidan has been a nurse for 10 years.

As of 2016, she is the Athlete Relations Manager at Aspetar, a specialised Orthopaedic and Sports Medicine Hospital in Doha.

Honours 
Zeidan was selected as a torchbearer to carry the Olympic flame in the UK as it made its way towards London 18 June 2012.

References

External links
 

1976 births
Living people
Female rally drivers
Qatari rally drivers
Qatari female archers
Qatari people of Lebanese descent
Qatari people of Turkish descent
Qatari Muslims
Sportspeople from Beirut
Sportspeople of Lebanese descent
Qatari people of Palestinian descent
Palestinian people of Turkish descent